Aarti Tikoo Singh is an Indian journalist who is known for being vocal on the Kashmir conflict and strongly considers herself secular. She is an alumnus of University of Jammu and did Masters in International Affairs from Columbia University in New York City.

Early life and education
Singh was born in the Anantnag district of Jammu and Kashmir, India into a Kashmiri Pandit family. After the exodus of Kashmiri Hindus from the Kashmir Valley in the early 1990s, she had to move to Jammu with her family. She studied in University of Jammu and also did Masters in International Affairs from New York's Columbia University and starting her career she went to New Delhi and is currently residing there.

Aarti Tikoo is married to Harbir Singh, a former politician with Aam Aadmi Party, as of 2021.

Career
As a reporter, she has worked in conflict zones across India such as Chhattisgarh, Jharkhand and Assam.

After working with dailies in India such as Hindustan Times and as Senior Assistant Editor with The Times of India, she  worked as a Foreign and Security Affairs Editor at the Indo-Asian News Service (IANS) agency. In August 2021, she founded The New Indian. Singh has over 20 years of experience in journalism, focusing on international relations and conflicts. She reported from the state of Jammu and Kashmir, a conflict-ridden state for almost seven years, covering politics, violence, governance and human stories. Singh represented in a United States Congressional hearing on Kashmir.

Awards
Singh is a Times Aspire award winner and a WISCOMP (Women in Security, Conflict Management Peace) fellowship awardee.

References

Further reading 
 Pawas Kumar, ed. (23 October 2019). 'World Press Overlooks Years Of Pakistan-Sponsored In Kashmir': Indian Journalist To US Congress. News Nation
 Deepshikha Ghosh, ed. (24 October 2019). On J&K, Indian Journalist's Face-Off With Ilhan Omar In US Congress. NDTV
 Ria Das (4 March 2019). These Brave Women Cops From Srinagar Were Witness To Pulwama. SheThePeople.TV
 PTI (25 October 2019). Kashmiri Pandits say US Congressional hearing was one sided. The Week.

Indian journalists
Indian women editors
Indian women columnists
Hindustan Times journalists
The Times of India journalists
Living people
1978 births
University of Jammu alumni
School of International and Public Affairs, Columbia University alumni
People from Jammu and Kashmir
Kashmiri Pandits
Indian people of Kashmiri descent